Pārgauja is a Latvian Floorball League team based in Stalbe parish, Latvia. 
Their most successful was 2016–17 season when Pārgauja lost the semi-finals against FK Lielvārde but won the bronze medals against FBK Valmiera.

Goaltenders
20  Anrijs Vents
31  Valts Stūris
71  Ģirts Priedītis

Defencemen
  7  Andris Erenbots
  8  Lauris Grāvelis
  9  Ivo Balodis
10  Sandis Jānelsiņš
11  Ingus Balodis
12  Gatis Gailis

Forwards
  2  Nils Auziņš
13  Aivis Ādminis
19  Lauris Ābols
28  Rolands Jānelsiņš
69  Druvis Slišāns
77  Ralfs Priedītis
88  Mārtiņš Zelčs

References
Pārgauja official web site

Floorball in Latvia
Latvian floorball teams

es:Pārgauja